Bekasi Timur Station (BKST, also known as Ampera Station or Bulak Kapal Station) is a class III railway station located in Duren Jaya, East Bekasi, Bekasi, West Java. The station, which is located at an altitude of +19 meters, is included in the Jakarta Operational Area I and only serves the KRL Commuterline route.

History

Bekasi Timur Station was inaugurated on 7 October 2017 by the Minister of Transportation of Indonesia, Budi Karya Sumadi, along with the inauguration of the KRL Commuterline Blue Line for  Station.

The reason for the creation of this station is because Bekasi station has exceeded its passenger capacity by almost 190% from morning and evening trips to and from work, so this station was built to break down the density of passengers at the station.

Building and layout 
Bekasi Timur Station has two railway tracks.

Services
The following is a list of train services at the Bekasi Timur Station.

Passenger services 
 KAI Commuter
  Cikarang Loop Line (Full Racket)
  Cikarang Loop Line (Half Racket), to / (via  and ) and

Supporting transportation

References

External links

Bekasi
Railway stations in West Java
Railway stations opened in 2017
2017 establishments in Indonesia